Sam Anderson-Heather (born 15 February 1988) is a former New Zealand rugby union player who played as a hooker for  in the ITM Cup and the  in Super Rugby.

Career

Anderson-Heather's early career was largely injury hit and despite being named in the Highlanders wider-training squad in both 2010 and 2011 he barely featured.   2012 saw an upturn in his fortunes and he got regular game time at ITM Cup level.   The departure of Shota Horie to the Melbourne Rebels in 2013 saw him firmly installed as back-up to Liam Coltman for the Otago Razorbacks.

Injuries to 2 of the Highlanders 3 senior hookers in the middle of the 2014 Super Rugby season saw Anderson-Heather called up as short-term injury cover.

References

1988 births
Living people
New Zealand rugby union players
Rugby union hookers
Otago rugby union players
Highlanders (rugby union) players
Rugby union players from Dunedin